Kathleen Spivack, née Drucker is an American poet and author.

Life
Spivack was born in New York, NY, and was raised in North Bennington, VT.  The eldest daughter of Peter Drucker, she graduated from Oberlin College in 1959 and won a fellowship to study at Boston University with Robert Lowell.

Her writing has been published The New Yorker, Ploughshares, The Atlantic Monthly, Poetry, Massachusetts Review, Virginia Quarterly, The Southern Review, Harvard Review, The Paris Review, The Kenyon Review, Agni and New Letters.

She has held posts at the University of Paris VII-VIII, the University of Francoise Rabelais, Tours, the University of Versailles, and at the Ecole Superieure (Polytechnique). She was a Fulbright Senior Artist/Professor in Creative Writing in France (1993–95).

Books
Unspeakable Things, New York: A. Knopf, 2016,  
With Robert Lowell and His Circle, University Press of New England, 2012, 
A History of Yearning, The Sow's Ear Poetry Review, 2010, 
Moments of Past Happiness, Earthwinds Editions, 2007, 
The Beds We Lie In, Scarecrow Press, 1986, 
The Honeymoon, Graywolf Short Fiction Series, 1986,

References

External links
With Robert Lowell and His Circle, The Boston Globe, Nov. 12, 2012.

Living people
Writers from New York City
American women poets
Oberlin College alumni
Poets from New York (state)
21st-century American women
Year of birth missing (living people)